The Japan men's national squash team represents Japan in international squash team competitions, and is governed by Japan Squash Association.

Current team
 Shinnosuke Tsukue
 Yuta Fukui
 Ryosei Kobayashi
 Ben Takamizawa Harris
 Tomotaka Endo

Results

World Team Squash Championships

Asian Squash Team Championships

See also 
 Japan Squash Association
 World Team Squash Championships
 Japan women's national squash team

References

External links 
 Team Japan

Squash teams
Men's national squash teams
Squash
Men's sport in Japan
Squash in Japan